The Coniochaeta are a genus of pleomorphic yeasts of the order Coniochaetales and are pathogens of trees. Some species have also been found to form endophytic associations within plants in which they live inside plant tissues but do not actually harm the organism. They can take the form of pink to brown colonies, hyphae, conidiophores or sclerotia. In 2013, the Lecythophora were merged with the Coniochaeta, following suggestions by Ziauddin Khan et al.

Ecology
The Coniochaeta have been described as typically associated with wood, water, and soil. However, there is also growing evidence of specialised associations between each species and specific environments, and a suggestion that 4-spored and 8-spored species interact differently with their environments, some species surviving forest fires, which activate their sexual cycle.

Medical Issues
Other members of the Coniochaeta, most commonly Coniochaeta polymorpha, can cause clinical infections in immunocompromised individuals, which has increased recent interest in the genus.

Species
As accepted by Species Fungorum;

 Coniochaeta acaciae 
 Coniochaeta africana 
 Coniochaeta albidomucosa 
 Coniochaeta alkalivirens 
 Coniochaeta angustispora 
 Coniochaeta arctispora 
 Coniochaeta arenariae 
 Coniochaeta areolatirubra 
 Coniochaeta arxii 
 Coniochaeta baysunika 
 Coniochaeta boothii 
 Coniochaeta burtii 
 Coniochaeta caffra 
 Coniochaeta calligoni 
 Coniochaeta caryotae 
 Coniochaeta cateniformis 
 Coniochaeta cephalothecoides 
 Coniochaeta cipronana 
 Coniochaeta coluteae 
 Coniochaeta cruciata 
 Coniochaeta cymbiformispora 
 Coniochaeta cypraeispora 
 Coniochaeta dakotensis 
 Coniochaeta deborreae 
 Coniochaeta decumbens 
 Coniochaeta dendrobiicola 
 Coniochaeta detonsa 
 Coniochaeta discoidea 
 Coniochaeta discospora 
 Coniochaeta dumosa 
 Coniochaeta elegans 
 Coniochaeta ellipsoidea 
 Coniochaeta emodensis 
 Coniochaeta endophytica 
 Coniochaeta euphorbiae 
 Coniochaeta extramundana 
 Coniochaeta fasciculata 
 Coniochaeta fibrosae 
 Coniochaeta fodinicola 
 Coniochaeta geophila 
 Coniochaeta gigantospora 
 Coniochaeta gymnosporiae 
 Coniochaeta haloxyli 
 Coniochaeta hansenii 
 Coniochaeta hericium 
 Coniochaeta hoffmannii 
 Coniochaeta iranica 
 Coniochaeta krabiensis 
 Coniochaeta leucoplaca 
 Coniochaeta ligniaria 
 Coniochaeta lignicola 
 Coniochaeta lutea 
 Coniochaeta luteorubra 
 Coniochaeta luteoviridis 
 Coniochaeta magniquadrispora 
 Coniochaeta malacotricha 
 Coniochaeta marina 
 Coniochaeta microspora 
 Coniochaeta mirabilis 
 Coniochaeta mongoliae 
 Coniochaeta montana 
 Coniochaeta multispora 
 Coniochaeta mutabilis 
 Coniochaeta myricariae 
 Coniochaeta navarrae 
 Coniochaeta nepalica 
 Coniochaeta niesslii 
 Coniochaeta nigerrima 
 Coniochaeta nivea 
 Coniochaeta nuciformis 
 Coniochaeta ornata 
 Coniochaeta ostrea 
 Coniochaeta ovata 
 Coniochaeta palaoa 
 Coniochaeta parasitica 
 Coniochaeta perangusta 
 Coniochaeta phalacrocarpa 
 Coniochaeta philocoproides 
 Coniochaeta pilifera 
 Coniochaeta polymegasperma 
 Coniochaeta polymorpha 
 Coniochaeta polysperma 
 Coniochaeta proteae 
 Coniochaeta prunicola 
 Coniochaeta pulveracea 
 Coniochaeta punctulata 
 Coniochaeta renispora 
 Coniochaeta rhopalochaeta 
 Coniochaeta rosae 
 Coniochaeta saccardoi 
 Coniochaeta salicifolia 
 Coniochaeta sarothamni 
 Coniochaeta savoryi 
 Coniochaeta scatigena 
 Coniochaeta simbalensis 
 Coniochaeta sinensis 
 Coniochaeta sordaria 
 Coniochaeta sphaeroidea 
 Coniochaeta subcorticalis 
 Coniochaeta taeniospora 
 Coniochaeta tetraspora 
 Coniochaeta tilakii 
 Coniochaeta trivialis 
 Coniochaeta vagans 
 Coniochaeta velutina 
 Coniochaeta velutinosa 
 Coniochaeta verticillata 
 Coniochaeta vineae 
 Coniochaeta williamsii 
 Coniochaeta xinjiangensis 
 Coniochaeta xylariispora 

Former species;
 C. brassicae  = Cladorrhinum olerum, Podosporaceae family
 C. calva  = Lasiosphaeria calva, Lasiosphaeriaceae
 C. canina  = Lecythophora canina, Coniochaetaceae
 C. capillifera  = Hypocopra capillifera, Xylariaceae
 C. elaeidicola  = Stilbohypoxylon elaeidicola, Xylariaceae
 C. ershadii  = Coniolariella ershadii, Xylariaceae
 C. hypoxylina  = Stilbohypoxylon hypoxylinum, Xylariaceae
 C. gamsii  = Coniolariella limonispora, Xylariaceae
 C. nodulisporioides  = Coniocessia nodulisporioides, Coniocessiaceae
 C. obliquata  = Rosellinia obliquata, Xylariaceae
 C. pilosella  = Capronia pilosella, Herpotrichiellaceae
 C. polyspora  = Sordaria polyspora, Sordariaceae
 C. queenslandiae  = Rosellinia queenslandiae, Xylariaceae
 C. sanguinolenta  = Helminthosphaeria sanguinolenta, Helminthosphaeriaceae

References

Sordariomycetes genera
Coniochaetales